Bryan County is a county located in the U.S. state of Georgia.  As of the 2020 census, the population was 44,738. The county seat is Pembroke.

Bryan County is part of the Savannah, GA Metropolitan Statistical Area.

The Bryan County Courthouse is listed on the National Register of Historic Places.

History 
Bryan County was created on December 19, 1793, named after Jonathan Bryan (1708–1788), an American Revolutionary War partisan.

South Bryan County is home to the earthen Civil War installation Fort McAllister (now Fort McAllister Historic Park) which Gen. William Sherman captured on his March to the Sea.

The colonial town of Hardwick, laid out in 1755, served as the initial county seat. In 1797, the Georgia General Assembly moved the county seat to Cross Roads near modern Richmond Hil. On November 18, 1814, the county seat was moved to Mansford on the Canoochee River. In 1860, the seat was known as Eden. By the 1880s the county seat was known as Bryan. By 1895 it was in Clyde, which may have been the same location formerly known as Eden and Mansford. Clyde served as the seat to 1935; in 1937 Pembroke took on that role.  The only remaining sign of Clyde is a cemetery on the Fort Stewart military reservation.

Geography 

A triangular area in the northeast of Bryan County, from northwest of Pembroke to north of Richmond Hill, is located in the Lower Ogeechee River sub-basin of the Ogeechee River basin, as is the northern half of the remaining area in the county south of Richmond Hill. The northwestern portion of the county, from east of Daisy to Richmond Hill, is located in the Canoochee River sub-basin of the Ogeechee River basin. The rest of Bryan County is located in the Ogeechee Coastal sub-basin of the same Ogeechee River basin.

Bryan County is unique in that it is totally divided by the military installation at Ft. Stewart. Pembroke is in more rural north Bryan, while Richmond Hill in south Bryan County is a suburb of Savannah. To travel between the two on public roads, it is necessary to leave the county.

Major highways 

  Interstate 16
  Interstate 95
  U.S. Route 17
  U.S. Route 80
  U.S. Route 280
  State Route 25
  State Route 26
  State Route 30
  State Route 67
  State Route 119
  State Route 144
  State Route 144 Spur
  State Route 204

Adjacent counties 
 Effingham County, Georgia - north
 Chatham County, Georgia - northeast
 Liberty County, Georgia - south/southwest
 Evans County, Georgia - west
 Bulloch County, Georgia - northwest

Demographics

2000 census
As of the census of 2000, there were 23,417 people, 8,089 households, and 6,511 families living in the county. There were 8,675 housing units at an average density of 20 per square mile (8/km2). The racial makeup of the county was 82.79% White, 14.14% Black or African American, 0.32% Native American, 0.77% Asian, 0.07% Pacific Islander, 0.58% from other races, and 1.34% from two or more races.  1.99% of the population were Hispanic or Latino of any race.

There were 8,089 households, out of which 45.00% had children under the age of 18 living with them, 64.40% were married couples living together, 11.90% had a female householder with no husband present, and 19.50% were non-families. Of all households, 16.40% were made up of individuals, and 5.80% had someone living alone who was 65 years of age or older.  The average household size was 2.88 and the average family size was 3.22.

In the county, the population was spread out, with 31.10% under the age of 18, 8.00% from 18 to 24, 31.90% from 25 to 44, 21.60% from 45 to 64, and 7.30% who were 65 years of age or older.  The median age was 33 years. For every 100 females, there were 98.20 males.  For every 100 females age 18 and over, there were 94.10 males.

The median income for a household in the county was $48,345, and the median income for a family was $53,680. Males had a median income of $39,606 versus $25,830 for females. The per capita income for the county was $19,794.  About 10.70% of families and 11.70% of the population were below the poverty line, including 14.70% of those under age 18 and 12.60% of those age 65 or over.

2010 census
As of the 2010 United States Census, there were 30,233 people, 10,738 households, and 8,462 families living in the county. The racial makeup of the county was 80.2% white, 14.2% black or African American, 1.6% Asian, 0.3% American Indian, 0.1% Pacific islander, 1.1% from other races, and 2.5% from two or more races. Those of Hispanic or Latino origin made up 4.4% of the population. In terms of ancestry, 17.1% were German, 13.9% were Irish, 10.6% were English, and 7.9% were American.

Of the 10,738 households, 44.6% had children under the age of 18 living with them, 60.3% were married couples living together, 13.9% had a female householder with no husband present, 21.2% were non-families, and 17.7% of all households were made up of individuals. The average household size was 2.81 and the average family size was 3.17. The median age was 35.7 years.

The median income for a household in the county was $63,244 and the median income for a family was $72,118. Males had a median income of $54,707 versus $32,245 for females. The per capita income for the county was $28,365. About 8.8% of families and 11.0% of the population were below the poverty line, including 16.0% of those under age 18 and 12.8% of those age 65 or over.

2020 census

As of the 2020 United States census, there were 44,738 people, 13,048 households, and 10,140 families residing in the county.

Education

Bryan County School District  is the designated school district for grades K-12 for the county, except parts in Fort Stewart. Fort Stewart has the Department of Defense Education Activity (DoDEA) as its local school district, for the elementary level. Students at the secondary level on Fort Stewart attend public schools operated by county school districts.

Communities

Cities
 Pembroke
 Richmond Hill

Unincorporated communities
 Black Creek
 Blitchton
 Ellabell
 Keller
 Lanier

Politics

Notable people 
 Gregg Allman, musician, Allman Brothers Band
 Mattie Belle Davis, first woman judge of Metropolitan Court of Dade County, Florida
 Justin Smiley, pro football player, All-American at University of Alabama
 John Smoltz, MLB pitcher, owned a summer home here while playing for the Atlanta Braves

See also

 National Register of Historic Places listings in Bryan County, Georgia
List of counties in Georgia

References

External links
 Coastal Georgia as seen from the water
 Early Bryan County History
 Official Bryan County Website
 Bryan County Board of Education
 Ft. McAllister State Park
 Bryan County historical marker

 
1793 establishments in Georgia (U.S. state)
Georgia (U.S. state) counties
Populated places established in 1793
Savannah metropolitan area